PEP (People, Events and Places) Talk is a Philippine lifestyle program of ABS-CBN from September 21, 1986 to July 3, 1990, and was replaced by The Inside Story.

Host
Loren Legarda

References

See also
List of shows previously aired by ABS-CBN

ABS-CBN original programming
1986 Philippine television series debuts
1990 Philippine television series endings
1980s Philippine television series
1990s Philippine television series
Filipino-language television shows